1574, 1580 and 1597: Walter Vaughan.

References

Mayors of places in Wales
People from Carmarthen